Butch The Cougar is the mascot of Washington State University. As his name indicates, Butch is a cougar.

History
Though the cougar was adopted as Washington State University's mascot in 1919 it was not until 1927 when a cougar cub was presented to the student body of Washington State that Butch T. Cougar was born.  The cougar was named Butch after Herbert "Butch" Meeker of Spokane, a WSU football star from the 1920s.

Butch was represented by a live cougar until 1978; Butch VI, in declining health with multiple ailments and approaching age 15, was euthanized in late August. That October, university president Glenn Terrell decided to discontinue the live mascot tradition.

Today Butch is represented by a costumed student.  Butch T. Cougar was the 2006 Capital One Mascot of the Year

Origin 
Butch T. Cougar was born on October 1st, 1927. Governor Roland H. Hartley presented the university with the first live cougar mascot during the 1927 football Homecoming game, and thus Butch's character was born. In the years since, Butch has undergone a few physical changes as he has been living on campus, surrounded by students. Nonetheless, he still has an untamed heart and continues to prowl around campus and athletic events.

Duties
The primary duty of Butch is to be an ambassador of WSU.  He can be seen roaming the sidelines at home American football and basketball games leading spirit chants and tossing shirts into the stands.  Butch also makes appearances at official University events and other events to promote the image of WSU. The student playing Butch is anonymous throughout the school year.  At the last home sporting event of each year, usually, the last home basketball game, the student beneath the Butch mask is revealed. Butch cannot only be seen at athletic events but also at other functions related to the university and its constituent groups. He is a source of pride for members of the Cougar family and a means of promoting the university.

See also
 List of U.S. college mascots
 Washington State University

References

External links
 Butch T. Cougar Homepage

Pac-12 Conference mascots
Washington State Cougars
1927 establishments in Washington (state)